The New Horizons Governor's School for Science and Technology (NHGS) is a magnet school located in Hampton, Virginia. Students of this school are chosen from the Gloucester, Hampton, Isle of Wight, Newport News, Poquoson, Williamsburg-James City and York County School Divisions.

Students attend the Governor's School during their junior and senior years. They take mathematics and science courses at the Governor's School in the morning or afternoon, depending on school division, and attend their home high schools for the remainder of their classes. Apart from its math and science courses, the Governor's School also offers Junior Research and Senior Mentorship classes. These classes are designed to expose students to areas they may not have had in their regular schools. Junior Research introduces NHGS juniors to research and the scientific process, skills that are invaluable later on in college environments. Senior Mentorship provides NHGS seniors with work experience in a specific field of science or technology. Financial support for the school is provided by the participating school divisions and the Gifted Programs Office of the Virginia Department of Education.

Curriculum
New Horizons students may choose between three subjects: Engineering, Biological Sciences, and Computational Science. Every student enrolled is required to take a specific research class depending upon grade level, as well as the appropriate math class.

Engineering
Prerequisites: Pre-Calculus
Calculus-based Engineering Physics I: Foundations & Modeling (2 HS/4 TNCC Credits)
Calculus-based Engineering Physics II: Maxwell to Hawking (2 HS/4 TNCC Credits)

Biological Science
Prerequisites: HS Biology, HS Chemistry, Algebra II/Trig
Advanced Chemical Analysis (2 HS/8 TNCC Credits)
Advanced Biological Analysis (2 HS/8 TNCC Credits)

Computational Science & Engineering
Prerequisites: Algebra II/Trig
Inquiry Physics & Programming I – Dynamics (2 HS/7 TNCC Credits)
Systems Modeling and Simulation & Scientific Programming II (2 HS/4 TNCC Credits)

Research
The junior year research experience involves various aspects of research methodology, ethics and statistics, critical thinking skills, and scientific writing and communication skills. The class centers around a research project that each student is required to submit to a panel of in school judges, and are allowed to the Tidewater Science Fair. Students in the past have done very well there.

Junior Research Methodology and Ethics (1 HS/3 TNCC Credits)
The senior year mentorship allows students to participate in a real-life work experience with professionals from a scientific area of the students' choosing. Students work closely with a mentor on a research project. Mentorship locations include, NASA Langley, Jefferson Lab, colleges, and other local businesses. Final projects are presented to the local scientific and professional community as a culminating experience in May. The opportunity to work with a professional in research is an invaluable experience toward career pursuits.

Senior Environmental Science/Honors Research & Mentorship (2 HS/6 TNCC Credits)
Provides broad background needed to understand the natural environment and to address issues in the modern world. Specific topics include sustainability, biodiversity, environment management, human population growth, energy, pollution, and urbanization

Mathematics
Modern Pre-Calculus (1 HS/6 TNCC Credits)
Calculus (1 HS/8 TNCC Credits)
Multi-Variable Calculus/Linear Algebra (1 HS/7 TNCC Credits)
Statistics (1 HS/3 TNCC Credits)

Notable alumni
Bruce Chittenden, former senior vice-president of software products at Citrix Systems. Former scientific programming teacher.
Dr. Julian Pittman, silver-medalist juggler and renowned toxicologist. Former junior research and ethics teacher.

References

External links
 New Horizons Governor's School for Science and Technology
 Pittman Magic
 Faculty Webpages

Public high schools in Virginia
Magnet schools in Virginia
Educational institutions established in 1985
1985 establishments in Virginia